Stanley Gerald Thompson (1912–1976) was an American chemist. He discovered together with Glenn T. Seaborg several of the transuranium elements. One of the elements is Californium, which he and several others made. He received Guggenheim Fellowships (Natural Sciences - Chemistry) in 1954 and 1965.

References

External links
Stanley G. Thompson - The man who delivered berkelium and californium (and won the Nobel Prize for Glenn Seaborg) (www.bonestamp.com)

1912 births
1976 deaths
20th-century American chemists
Manhattan Project people